The men's 400 metres hurdles event was part of the track and field athletics programme at the 1920 Summer Olympics. The competition was held on Sunday, August 15, 1920, and on Monday, August 16, 1920. 19 runners from 9 nations competed. Nations were limited to 4 hurdlers each. The event was won by Frank Loomis of the United States, the fourth consecutive victory (in four appearances of the event) by an American. The United States secured its second sweep in the event, and first with other nations competing (only Americans had run in 1900), with John Norton taking silver and August Desch bronze.

Background

This was the fourth time the event was held. It had been introduced along with the men's 200 metres hurdles in 1900, with the 200 being dropped after 1904 and the 400 being held through 1908 before being left off the 1912 programme. However, when the Olympics returned after World War I, the men's 400 metres hurdles was back and would continue to be contested at every Games thereafter.

There was no favorite in the event, which was not a common competition (and had not been held at the previous Games).

Australia, Belgium, Czechoslovakia, Finland, South Africa, and Sweden each made their debut in the event. The United States made its fourth appearance, the only nation to have competed at every edition of the event to that point.

Competition format

As in 1908, the competition consisted of three rounds: quarterfinals, semifinals, and a final. Ten sets of hurdles were set on the course. The hurdles were 3 feet (91.5 centimetres) tall and were placed 35 metres apart beginning 45 metres from the starting line, resulting in a 40 metres home stretch after the last hurdle.

There were 5 quarterfinal heats, with between 2 and 5 athletes each. The top 2 men in each quarterfinal advanced to the semifinals. The 10 semifinalists were divided into 2 semifinals of 5 athletes each, with the top 3 in each semifinal advancing to the 6-man final.

Records

These were the standing world and Olympic records (in seconds) prior to the 1920 Summer Olympics.

Frank Loomis set a new world record with 54.0 seconds in the final.

Schedule

Results

Quarterfinals

Quarterfinal 1

Quarterfinal 2

Quarterfinal 3

Quarterfinal 4

Quarterfinal 5

Semifinals

Semifinal 1

Semifinal 2

Final

The final was held on Monday, August 16, 1920.

Results summary

References

External links
 
 

Hurdles 400 metre
400 metres hurdles at the Olympics